Karri is a given name and surname.

Given name

Karri Hietamäki (born 1969), Finnish cross country skier
Karri Käyhkö (born 1937), Finnish swimmer
Karri Kivi (born 1970), Finnish ice hockey player and coach
Karri Koira, Finnish rapper, R&B artist and producer
Karri McMahon (born 1992), Australian field hockey player
Karri Narayana Rao, Indian politician
Karri Rämö (born 1986), Finnish professional ice hockey
Karri Somerville (born 1999), Australian field hockey player
Karri Turner (born 1966), American television actress
Karri Willms (born 1969), Canadian curler and curling coach

Surname
Nagendra Karri (born 1982), American film director, producer and screenwriter
Ramesh Karri, American computer scientist
Sriram Karri (born 1973), Indian English-language novelist

See also

Karra (name)
Karre
Karrie
Kari (name)
Karli (name)
Kadri (name)
Karki (surname)

Finnish masculine given names